= C-Dance =

Belgian dance music radio station

C-Dance is a Belgian radio station broadcasting dance music. It has been operational since 1 March 1996. From 1998 to 2002, C-Dance claimed to have been the most popular dance radio network in Belgium. In more recent years, C-Dance's only remaining frequency was 105.6 FM (Antwerp region). When its FM broadcast license expired in 2017, the station went digital-only.
